Mende is a commune and the prefecture of the department of Lozère, in the region of Occitania, Southern France. Its inhabitants are called the Mendois. The city, including the first traces of dwellings date back to 200 BC, was originally named Mimata, probably in reference to the mountains that surround it.

Mende is located between Clermont-Ferrand and Montpellier, but also on the axis of Lyon–Saint-Étienne–Albi–Toulouse. The other important nearby towns are Aurillac and Saint-Flour (Cantal), Le Puy-en-Velay (Haute-Loire), Rodez, Millau (Aveyron) and Alès and Nîmes (Gard).

Even though Mende remains a relatively sparsely populated city (approximately 12,000 inhabitants), it remains the most important of the Lozère Department. In addition, it is the city-centre of the unique urban area of this department.

It is the seat of the Roman Catholic Diocese of Mende.

Geography

Situation

Mende is situated in the high valley of the Lot, in a mountainous area, in the Pays du Gévaudan, the Rieucros stream joins to it on its right bank. On the right bank, residential areas extend over different causses, including the Causse d'Auge. Located on the axis of Lyon-Toulouse, the city has long been a commercial crossroads between the Auvergne, Rhone and the Languedoc.

The commune is bordered by Chastel-Nouvel to the north, Badaroux to the east, Lanuéjols to the southeast, Brenoux and Saint-Bauzile to the south, Balsièges to the southwest, and Barjac and Servières to the west.

Mende is one of the "gateway cities" (along with Millau, Lodève, Alès and Ganges) for the site of the Causses and Cévennes, of world heritage by UNESCO under the inscription "Les Causses and Cevennes, Mediterranean agro-pastoral cultural landscape".

According to the INSEE, Mende is an urban commune without suburbs (ville isolée [isolated town]). It lies at the centre of an functional urban area composed of 31 communes, the only one in the department of Lozère.

The Causses

The region of the Causses in Lozère is one of the four  of Lozère, with the Margeride, the Aubrac and the Cévennes. The city is nestled in the middle of different Causses which form as natural barriers. However, over the 20th century, urbanisation began to extend beyond these limits.

Of the Causses,  is the most significant. A first wooden cross was planted in 1900 or 1907. It was replaced a few years later, on 8 July 1933, a Jubilee year, by a -high iron cross. Until 1945, this cross was the place of large gatherings in honour of Mendois soldiers. This cross has been illuminated since the summer of 1965. The mount also houses the chapel where Privat, the martyr of the Gévaudan, withdrew to. At its foot lies the area of Vabre where can be found the first remains of houses in the city. Opposite this is the Causse d'Auge (northeast) and the Causse du Crouzet (northwest), and the Margeride mountains beyond. To the west is Causse de Changefège, located between Mende and Barjac, which complements the borders of the city.

Geology
The geology of the city of Mende is very dependent on the surrounding causses and streams that pass through them. The Mont Mimat and the Causse de Changefège are composed of limestone of the "Grands Causses", thus presenting abrupt edges. The other causses (as well as the butte de Fontanille) are composed of limestone of the "Petits Causses" (without these edges). The Lot Valley is composed of marl. The  Valley, in the south of Mende, is full of blue marl, leaving one to presuppose that the marl of the town of Mende would be, in part, of the same origin. Finally, the various streams (the Rieucros) of the causses of the north of the city are lined by mica-schist.

Hydrology

The city of Mende was built on the banks of the Lot. The most significant of them is located in the Vabre district, close to the first houses. These sources have also often been channeled and feed the underground water system of the city, visible on the surface through numerous fountains and the old wash house. The streets, such as the Rue du Torrent, attest to the passage of water from Mont Mimat.

To the north, on the other side of the Lot, the sources are much more distant, but water is present in the stream known as Rieucros.

Climate

Mende is subject to an oceanic stream that comes from the Aubrac and Mediterranean and flows from the Cévennes. The department of Lozère, Mende in particular, benefit from insolation (or sunlight) similar to that of Toulouse with approximately 2,069 hours of sunshine per year.

In more detail, here are some statements in Mende records since 1985:

Routes and transportation

Mende is located in the centre of the Lozère department and therefore centralises the roads. The city has rail and air access, but the Lot is not navigable (too shallow) as with all the rivers of the department (except for recreational canoeing, or in rare exceptions for the transport of people such as the crossing of the Tarn towards La Malène).

Road network
The road comes from Balsièges to the west and Badaroux to the east. This axis can be reached easily. Haute-Loire and Ardèche are to the east, via Langogne and Aveyron is to the west via La Canourgue-Banassac, as well as the A75 autoroute. A road doubling project is underway in the department, bypassing Mende from the north. This doubling is however a long project (1993), having had several outlines and some opposition. The project was finally abandoned in October 2012 making Lozère a department without draft dual carriageways on RN 88. Indeed, its neighbours Aveyron and Tarn continue their projects of dual carriageways between Rodez and Toulouse with all expected to be commissioned in December 2015. The work of the Rodez - Séverac section should be completed by the end of 2019. The same will be the case for Haute-Loire, which continues its road access. However, the workarounds of Mende and Langogne are budgeted. These projects in adjacent departments will reach major cities nearby to Mende (Rodez, Albi, Toulouse, Le Puy and even Lyon). Finally, the economic impact or the absence of dual carriageways in Lozere must be assessed in the medium and long term.

Furthermore, a viaduct (the Rieucros Viaduct) commissioned in December 2009 will be used to ensure a first bypass of Mende. It connects the industrial area of the Causse d'Auge to the technological centre of Valcroze (and the RD 42) and also helps to relieve the traffic connecting the districts north and northwest of the city.

The RN 88 deviation from Mende should be the first from Pelouse to reach up to the Causse d'Auge with an "expressway" configuration. These two sections will only be of two lanes. Subsequently, the expressway from the Causse d'Auge will be directly linked to the A 75.

Another national road, the RN 106, formerly ran through the city. This name is no longer valid for the section coming from the Gard and joining Mende via Florac (it is then of the RN 88 on the stretch between Balsièges and Mende). The northern part of the road was decommissioned in 2007 and now bears the name of D 806. This stretch goes from Mende to Saint-Chély-d'Apcher (and the A75 autoroute) via Chastel-Nouvel.

Rail network

This line, built at the very beginning of the 20th century, bears the nickname of "ligne du toit de la France" [the roof of France line], and Mende is the main railway station. Ten weekly links are provided by rail.

The station is also the starting point of the TER connection to Clermont-Ferrand by bus, which is daily.

Urban transport network
Referred to as TUM (for Transports Urbains Mendois) the urban transport network is exclusively equipped with buses, which run through the city and some nearby villages (Les Boulaines, Chabrits, Chabannes). Since its establishment in 2000, it has replaced the school bus service. The urban transport network is also responsible for the management of the pay car parks in the city. A part of the city centre is also exclusively pedestrian.

Air transport

The prefecture of the Lozère department shares  with the neighbouring village of Brenoux. Highlights include it being the site of the final scene of the film La Grande Vadrouille, and also of five stages of the Tour de France (1995, 2005, 2010, 2015 and 2018).

Furthermore, a Mende-Paris air link was implemented in October 2007. This connection was born of a desire to open up Mende to air travel, which is indeed late at this level for a prefecture, and has no direct flight to Paris unlike its neighbours Clermont-Ferrand, Rodez, Aurillac or Le Puy-en-Velay.

Since the beginning of 2008, a study has been conducted by the CCI of the Lozère department, in order to discuss the possibility of the establishment of a link between the Lozerian prefecture and the regional capital, Montpellier but four years after the launch of this study, no concrete project to date has been presented.

Finally, two more major airports with international influence and close to Mende are Clermont-Ferrand Aulnat and Rodez-Aveyron.

Urban planning

Five historic sections

In the 13th century, the city was concentrated in what is now the city centre, bounded by the boulevards, and formerly the ramparts. It was then split into five sections (or neighbourhoods) known as pans: Auriac, Aygues-Passe, Champnau, Chastel and Claustres.

When it was initially named as such, the Pan d'Auriac was mainly a place of settlement, before becoming the quartier des pénitents blancs [district of the white penitents] who settled there. The Pan d'Aygues-Passe (or Aigues-Passe), meaning "water that passes", owes its name to the inclination of its streets, where the water flowed during cleaning. The Pan de Champnau derives its name from new field, and includes what was a new residential area, at north of the city. The Pan de Chastel is the old commercial district of the city. It is located towards the Chastel Gate, which led then to Chastel-Nouvel, where a castle stood which was property of the bishops.

The modern districts of the city

The historic centre

The historic city centre is bordered by boulevards which took the place of the ancient walls. In addition to housing, the centre is mostly occupied by convenience stores and artisans. Beyond the boulevards, there are other houses as well as government buildings. The General Council and the prefecture indeed share the former , but services are scattered throughout the city. Allée Piencourt connects downtown roads to Badaroux and Chastel-Nouvel, near the ancient diocese (pré claux and pré vival) having been built.

Mende North (Chaldecoste), the Causse d'Auge

North of the Allée Piencourt, past the Berlière Bridge, dwellings are present at the foot of the Causse d'Auge. These were established in several instalments over the 19th and 20th centuries, the first of these being Chaldecoste. It is in this part of the city that the large and the small seminary as well as the Convent of Carmel are found. The city extends to the north in the direction of Alteyrac (commune of Chastel-Nouvel). Between these areas and Alteyrac is located the zone of economic activities (ZAE) of the Causse d'Auge. The northern districts often bear names of flowers, this part of the city that historically sheltered gardens and vineyards, along the draille linking the Plateau du Palais du Roi [King's Palace Plateau].

Fontanilles

Above the Badaroux road, on a hill, lies the Fontanilles district. It was originally social housing. At the foot of the hill is the Lycée Notre-Dame, while beyond the district of Saint-Laurent (where one finds traces of history with the presence of a chapel and a windmill) and, later, the Gardès ZAE. In this part, to the west of Gardès, is also the village of Sirvens where traces of a Gallo-Roman villa were discovered.

Mende South, Mont Mimat

Stuck between Fontanille, Mont Mimat and the city centre, are districts located roadside above pré claux. In this area are located the centre of firefighters, the Château of Bellesagne and the former gendarmerie. The market is also in this area, but more to the east than the precedents cited (beyond the boulevards, however). Above it lies the Vabre district and Hill of the Executioner where the first traces of dwellings of the city were found. Also nearby is the city's prison.

Le Chapitre and the road to Chabrits

In the westerly direction, found the District of Le Chapitre with the sports complex and the holiday village. This area is at the foot of a portion of the Causse de Changefège, where homes are installed along the Chabrits road (Avenue du 11-Novembre, north-west of the city). It is in this part of the city which the district of Valcroze is found (new in the 19th century), the Chabrits ZAE and technology park.

Balsièges road

It is in this part where retail establishments are found. The Ramille zone saw the introduction, despite some criticism about the instability of the ground, of the hypermarket of the department, as well as a commercial area.

City map

On the map are the main roads of the city. To the west, the RN 88 is joined to Balsièges, passing through the Rocher de Moïse (classified site) located at the left end. To the northwest, it is the hamlet of Chabannes, and further to Chabrits. To the south,  is found,  where the new cross stands which symbolically marks the top of the hill (although it continues a little higher).

To the east, Fontanille district is on a hillock, circumvented by the Lot. Behind lies the district of Saint-Laurent, then the ZAE de Gardès (and the village of the same name) and the village of Sirvens. Following the RN 88, one reaches Badaroux. Finally to the north, is the area of the Chaldecoste (broken down into several districts: Bergerie, Chanteperdrix, Vignette, etc.) where one can reach the ZAE du causse d'Auge. The drinking water of the city of Mende comes from this direction, because of the Lac de Charpal reservoir, which is the main source.

Housing
In 2017, Mende had 6,851 residences for an official population of 12,134 people. 87% of them are primary residences and 6.1% of secondary residences, which contrasts sharply with the figure of the Lozère department amounting to a 32.3% share of secondary housing.

The population has been growing for several years, and the city has acquired new quarters over the years: Chaldecoste and Chanteperdrix in the 1970s, La Bergerie in the 1990s, and Valcroze in the 2000s. The city has 17.9% of HLM-type accommodations.

59% of dwellings have four rooms or more and 19% have three rooms. The city is composed of many individual homes, small and large dwellings remaining in the minority. However, one can see that between 1990 and 1999 there was an increase of 85.3% of dwellings of one or two rooms. This can partly be explained by the development of higher education, with the branch of the University of Perpignan.

Toponymy
The region is an ancient site of settlement dating back to the Bronze Age, although the capital of the Gévaudan, the Gallic period then Gallo-Roman, was Anderitum. Found in the ancient texts are the names of Mimate, Mimata (mountain), which refer to this town at the foot of Mons Mimatensis. In the same spirit, another name circulating is that of Viculus Mimatensis (or Vicus Mimatensis). It is the city which gave its name to Mont Mimat ("mount of the Mendois", literally) and not vice versa.

History

Gallo-Roman era

Traces of dwellings dating from 200 BC were found, ancient Roman villae, as well as around the city. However, residents could have been be domiciled here well before. Indeed, on Mont Mimat to Chapieu, a dolmen was found around 1913 including a trepanned skull. The other surrounding plateaux also attest this presence with other dolmens (on the Causse de Changefege for example). These remains may date from the Chalcolithic period.

The city, strictly speaking, dates from the Middle Ages, and it is not found cited at the end of the 6th century by Gregory of Tours in his Histoire des Francs. Mende in the 3rd century was then only a village. The history of Privat is thus situated around the 3rd century, while he was sent by Austromoine to evangelize the Gévaudan. It was during this period that the Alemanni invaded the country, guided by their leader, Chrocus.

The Gabali took refuge in the fortress of Grèzes where they were under siege for two years. Their bishop, Privat, was meanwhile in one of the caves of Mont Mimat which he had converted into a hermitage. When Chrocus learned that the bishop was not among his people, he went looking for him to use as a hostage in order to get the Gabali to leave Grèzes. Privat was martyred at his cave on  near the village of Mimate. Presented to the Gabali, he refused to deliver his people despite all the barbaric tortures to which he was subjected (according to Gregory of Tours:"The good shepherd refused to deliver his sheep to wolves, and they tried to force his to sacrifice to demons"). Exhausted, the Alemanni would leave the Gabali free, by promising them peace. Privat succumbed to his injuries in the following days. His act of resistance, refusing to deliver his compatriots, thus earned him great popular fervour, and it was around his tomb and his hermitage that pilgrimage began, allowing the village to grow.

Middle Ages

In the 12th century Gévaudan was part of the County of Barcelona. In Mende, the counties have a castle, the castel frag. Three other lords had their castle around the Romanesque church: That of Canilhac (who owned the archtreasurer rights of the church), that of Cabrières (who was granted rights of archdeacon) and Dolan (who administered and ruled the episcopal home during the interregnum of bishops). In 1161, Mende, who was under the suzerainty of the King of France, saw his Bishop  get the royal rights. It was the golden bull, an act signed by the king and marked with a royal seal in gold, which contained the terms of this agreement. It thus gave Aldebert and his successors, in perpetuity, the Royal power and the full powers of justice on the inhabitants of the bishopric. This fact is quite rare because only four golden bulls in six centuries were granted by the Kings of France.

It was from this time that the city walls were built. This allowed the monitoring of the direct route between Mont Lozère and Villefort, in other words towards the Regordane Way, trade route.

At that time, however, Mende was not provided the civil and religious capital of Gévaudan. In fact the power was always dependent of two entities: The county and Viscount of Grèzes. The Viscount, property of the King of Aragon, was recovered by the King of France in 1258. The bishop had great power as a vassal, but he didn't have the total legitimacy of some Royal officials. This situation ended from 1307 with the Act of paréage between Bishop Guillaume VI Durand and King Philip IV. Indeed, it definitively fixed the possessions of the king and those of the bishop, even if some disputes persisted.

During the Hundred Years' War security increased with the strengthening of the fortifications and the construction of ditches to 1361-1362. At that time, the chapter of Mende had a castle on the heights of the city, Chastel-Nouvel. In 1370 many locals felt safe from the ramparts of the city, despite threats from the routiers. Also, few of them took refuge in Chastel-Nouvel. But the walls were insufficient, and could not prevent the pillages. This period isolated Mende from its neighbours, including Le Puy-en-Velay, and waited the arrival of the Constable of France, Bertrand du Guesclin, then the intervention of Charles VI and the liberation of the region so that the roads reopened around 1452.

In 1390,  was in Mende, where John III of Armagnac sought, on behalf of the King of France, to put an end to the private war that Raymond de Turenne led against the Pope from Avignon. The Gascon signed as a witness to an agreement between the legate of Clement VII, Antoine de Lisa, and a representative of the Viscount of Turenne. This interview of Mende helped the Florentines to send ambassadors to solicit the Count of Armagnac. He was proposed to cross the Alps and attack the Count of Vertus in Lombardy.

It was also at this time that Pope Urban V began the work of the cathedral (1368), for a completion in 1467. By its letters patent, King Louis XI confirmed the privileges for this cathedral, granted by his predecessors, in September 1464.

At the beginning of the 1470s, conflict erupted between Bishop  and King Louis XI, because of the support that the bishop had given to the County of Armagnac when it had revolted. To counter it, the king subtracted La Panouse authority over the city which then became autonomous. It wasn't until 1478 that the bishops found authority over the city, sharing revenues with the consul.

At the end of the Hundred Years' War, Mende developed its production of drapery, and thus increased its role as a commercial crossroads between the Languedoc and Auvergne, exporting its fame. It is estimated that in the 16th century Mende was one of the richest dioceses of Languedoc before Montpellier and Toulouse. This wealth of the diocese reinforced the ecclesiastical power. Thus among the list of the bishops of the time one can count a number from the family of the Pope. Giuliano della Rovere was ordained bishop of Mende, although he never visited in the capital of Gévaudan (practice known as commendation). During his tenure, François adorned the cathedral with its bell towers, which one hosted the  Non Pareille, the largest bell in the world.

In October 1485, when Clement de La Rovere came to the episcopal seat, old quarrels between the consul and the bishopric re-emerged, first mentioned with fear of losing this privilege. Thus they barricaded the gates of Mende, so that the bishop could not access. At this time the bishops primarily used their Balsièges Castle as a residence (that of Chanac being the summer residence). In vain as the Della Rovere family covered the full authority by notice of the king in 1492. The title of consul was held in place of the traditional title of trustee.

Renaissance

In the 16th century, the main events were the Reformation and the Wars of Religion which resulted. On 21 July 1562, 4,000 Protestants got within the walls of the city. They destroyed the unprotected monuments and besieged the city by depriving it of water. They withdrew four days later, largely due to being given 2,000 ecus. This ransom ensured the city a few years of peace.

During the St. Bartholomew's Day massacre,  Astorg de Peyre was murdered in the king's room: his widow then hired a young man, Matthieu Merle to avenge the death of her husband. From 1569 to 1576 he held with his troops the fortress of Grèzes where he gradually seized the north of Gévaudan. From 1577 he moved with his troops to Marvejols intending to seize Mende, although not ceasing his conquests to the north, he failed however in August 1578 at Saint-flour. The night of Christmas 1579, to enter the city, Merle's soldiers expected that the people of Mendes were at midnight mass.

During his stay in Mende, Merle made further fortification to the city, not hesitating razing 120 homes to restore the ramparts. In February 1581, while he ruled all the Gévaudan, he enforced the threat he had made to the people. He had in fact asked them to deliver 4,000 ecus, a sum that the Mendois could not collect. He partially destroyed Mende Cathedral built by Pope Urban V. He saved a bell tower to avoid damaging the episcopal palace where his home was established. It was at this time that the Non Pareille was melted, the biggest bell in the world, to manufacture culverins and other cannonballs. The city was liberated on bail that year thanks to the intervention of the King of Navarre.

The city liberated, a seneschal was created to ensure the peace. Response to the attack of Merle was organised in 1586 against the town of Marvejols, led by baron de Saint-Vidal. It was during this response that the Peyre fortress disappeared from the rock of Peyre. The seneschal took its place. The Tower of Auriac, today known as the Tower of Penitents, was built to accommodate one hundred soldiers. The seneschal gradually took precedence over the diocese, which called for the help of the Duke of Languedoc in 1597. It was after this episode that the Seneschal of Mende disappeared.

From the 17th century to the French Revolution

The beginning of the 17th century was coloured by the work of reconstruction of the cathedral for an inauguration in 1605, although work had lasted until 1629. Far from the splendour of the original, while taking up the same plane, this new cathedral was characterised by a bell tower which was smaller than the other.

Between 1645 and 1660, the city was the scene of strife between two rival factions: The Marmaux and the Catharinaux, all members of the consuls or the bourgeoisie, but not having the same opinion on the importance of episcopal power, the latter being opposed. The bishop was also the target of an attack while he officiated in Mende Cathedral in 1645 (he was actually not touched). After several trials, it was not without difficulty that the kingdom gave back his ancestral power, the consul remaining under his control.

At the end of the century,  landscaped a lane which joined to the Lot (since known as "Allée Piencourt") and especially acquired the Aubusson tapestries for the episcopal palace. These tapestries, classified, since adorn the cathedral. It was also behind the early educational development in the city and contributed to the building of the hospital. It also made the hospital its heir, allowing it to develop.

In 1702, the war of the Camisards was triggered in the Cévennes. Mende somewhat landscaped its walls in order to prevent any attack. However, this war which began with the murder of Father du Chayla at Le Pont-de-Montvert never reached Mende.

In 1721, the Great Plague arrived in Gévaudan affecting the town of Mende with an amount of 1,078 victims in one year. Two generations later, the walls were removed (in 1768), "so the air circulates better".

Once all these troubles passed, the city redeveloped its economy around wool and sheep farming. The city extended a little bit under the development of the appearance of the mills, and its first factory. In 1754, Mende saw Louis Mandrin the famous brigand, who lodged in a house there and, according to legend, hid treasure.

Between 1764 and 1767, Mende was the witness the comings and goings of the wolf-hunters of the king, who came to seek rest in the city before returning to hunt the beast which was terrorising the north of the country. It was seen close to Mende, once at Pailhou and between Rieutort-de-Randon and Chastel-Nouvel but remained primarily in Margeride. At this time the quarrel between the consul and the bishop was brought up to date by the edict on municipal organizations. The burghers and nobles opposed, but the bishop finally retained power in 1771.

During the French Revolution, Mende had to share with Marvejols the function of department capital of Gévaudan. This was renamed in the Lozère department in 1790, and the guardianship of the church disappeared in 1791, thus putting an end to the paréage of 1307. Mende was the scene of small counter-revolutionary clashes, but without great effects. It became the sole capital shortly after.

Since the 19th century

In 1800, the prefect settled in the city, and the prefecture occupies the episcopal palace after the sale of the property of the church. In the middle of the 19th century, the causses around Mende are planted with Austrian black pine, this national forest has continued since then. The choice of black pine was due to its ease of acclimation, and its robustness. The presence of this forest often protected Mende from floods.

Then the railway appeared in the prefecture, then linking to Sévérac-le-Château (3 May 1884). The railway line follows the Lot to cross the city, and also continues to follow, like the newly created road. In 1887 the old episcopal palace disappeared in flames, the prefecture had to be rebuilt.

On 8 April 1888 Mende became one of the first cities in France, and the first chef-lieu to have electric lighting. The plant was installed in the old .

The twentieth century was marked by a beginning of economic decline. The gradual end of the wool industry, the First and the Second World War depopulated the city. Between 1931 and 1934 baths are built, since becoming the  Home, and located on the market square. The building was destroyed in summer 2013, to be replaced by a multi-cultural hall.

In 1939, shortly before World War II, an internment camp was built in the woods of the Rieucros. The population was opposed to this transit camp for anti-fascists and communists. It then became an internment camp exclusively for women. The mayor at the time, condemned the Vichy regime and the camp in his hometown, where he made sure that children interned with their mother followed a normal education. His hostile words and acts to the regime in place led him to be removed from his post in 1941. He then joined Resistance where he became one of the leaders for the Lozère. Arrested and sent to German camps in 1944, he died during a transfer in 1945.

Ideally placed between the Maquis of the Cévennes and the Aubrac, the town was located as well as a centre for the coordination of the Lozère Interior Resistance. As for the population, it protected itself  where shelters against aerial bombardments were implemented.

From the 1970s, the city had a sizable population growth. The city then extended to the Causse d'Auge. In the 1980s and 1990s, one can also see that the department was depopulating overall, while its prefecture was expanding. Culture and sport took more importance in the life of the city.

During the 1990s, the city developed administrative reconciliations with nearby cities. Therefore, it formed the Estelle city network with Aurillac and Rodez. The principle of the network was to share experiences and pool resources to develop such medium-sized cities. Shortly after, it was with other networks that Mende became closer to other cities of the Massif Central. This is the case, for example, with the Cyber Massif network dedicated to the digital opening up of the region.

Moreover, since the beginning of the 21st century, Mende had tried to actively participate in the policies of opening up of the Massif Central. It also seeks to enroll in a sustainable development project, in the image of the department with, among other projects, the construction of a cogeneration plant and the establishment of a network of heat. The timber industry, so important in the economy of the city, could therefore be put to further use. The establishment of bio-energy in the city has also been carried out by the appearance of a wind farm north of the city.

Politics and administration

Mende is the chef-lieu of the Lozère department: It welcomes in this regard the prefecture and the headquarters of the General Council. The buildings of these two institutions are scattered within the city. A project of the Department Hall to consolidate all services of the General Council is under consideration. The mayor's office is housed in the town hall which dates from the 18th century, however, a large part of the services have been moved to the annex of the mayor's office.

City hall
This is the old consular house which was used as a city hall of the Revolution until 1852. On that date, Mayor Becamel bought the Pages family mansion located in the Place d'Angiran. Since then the city hall has been based in this city mansion (listed historical monument) in the square which has become Place Charles-de-Gaulle, although a part of the services is now located in the annex which faces it. As the cathedral, the city hall also houses the tapestries of Aubusson, classified since 1909.

Political trends and results

List of mayors
Since 1945, the following were elected mayors of the city of Mende:

Intercommunality

It was created in December 2001 under the name of Communauté de communes de la Haute Vallée d'Olt before changing its name in 2009. The commune being the largest in terms of population, it was its mayor, Jean-Jacques Delmas, who became the first president of the community.

The implementation of this community of communes has allowed a transfer of powers. So, all areas of economic activity and sports facilities now fall under the responsibility of the community, rather than the commune itself.

However, the actions are much wider since waste treatment also enters the competence of the community. The waste disposal site of the commune lies in the ZAE du Causse d'Auge, north of the city. In this context, unsorted collection is also the responsibility of the community of communes.

This community of communes is not the only grouping of communities for the town of Mende. A comprehensive plan was implemented around the label Pays d'Art et d'Histoire de Mende et Lot en Gévaudan [Lands of art and history of Mende and Lot in Gevaudan]. These are twenty-two communes which now belong to the Pays d'Art [Lands of Art] which comes in the continuity of the city of art and history label which Mende has had since 1981.

Administrative division
The city is the chef-lieu of two cantons: Mende-1 and Mende-2 since 2015. Mende-1 comprises the northern part of the city, Mende-2 the southern part.

Courts

Before the Act of paréage of 1307, Mendoise and Gevaudanaise justice was fully devolved to the bishops. This power was shared with the king after the signing of the Act. Power was shared between the various  for the communal land, with Mende being in the land of the bishops and Marvejols in lands of the king, and like this until 1789.

The courthouse was built between 1833 and 1835. On 18 February 1994, it was the target of a bombing by the FLNC.

The tribunal groups together a children's tribunal, a tribunal of commerce, a court and a high court.

The city has long held prisons. Current prison was commissioned in 1891. One of the first high-security areas of France was then moved there in 1949. It was at this date that the prison ownership changed, from the State Department. Several personalities have stayed here, the most famous being Jacques Mesrine. André Génovès' film, Mesrine released in 1983, also tells of the criminal plan to destroy the QHS.  had sought to bring Jacques Mesrine out of prison when he was imprisoned in Mende. This area had also been the target of critics, such as those of the Committee of action of prisoners and Serge Livrozet, in 1975. The last prison 'personality' of Mende, activist of the  alongside José Bové, was imprisoned after the case of the McDonald's franchise destruction in Millau.

Twin towns – sister cities

Mende is twinned with:
 Wunsiedel, Germany (1980)
 Volterra, Italy (1993)
 Vila Real, Portugal (2003)

Since 2007, the cities of Wunsiedel and Volterra are also paired together. The twinning with Vila Real (much more populous than the city of Mende) is explained by the fact that a large part of the Portuguese population of Mende, and Lozère in general, is from this region.

Population and society

Demographics

Demographic evolution
In contrast to the department of Lozère, the prefecture saw its demographic curve draw increasingly since the French Revolution. This may explain why Mende has not experienced the same trend as Lozère. This table shows the demographic for the town of Mende, but it can be considered that the bassin Mendois [Mende area] follows the same trend.

In 2017, the commune had 12,134 inhabitants.

Age structure

The Mende population is fairly young taking into account the ageing population of Lozère. Compared with the 1990 census, it is the age group of 15–29 years which has had the greatest increase at the expense of those aged 0–14 and 30–44 years. The number of near-centenarians was also greater in 1999 than in 1990.

Immigration
In Mende, the share of the immigrant population represents about 8% of the total population. They originate mostly from Portugal (mainly from Vila Real), Morocco, Algeria, and Turkey. This being the image of immigration in the region. The Spanish immigration, which was very present in the middle of the twentieth century, has been disappearing since the 1970s.

Education

Mende has three nursery schools: Solelhons (the small Suns in Occitan), the Chênes school and Fontanilles school. They are in close relations with the primary schools of the Groupe solaire, Annex Michel del Castillo School and Fontanilles School, Jeanne d'Arc School dealing with private education.

The public college of Henri-Bourillon is located in the former small seminary, and share places with the Lycée Chaptal. It hosts students from the city as well as a number from other neighbouring municipalities (Badaroux, Barjac, Chanac, Saint-Bauzile, Saint-Étienne-du-Valdonnez, etc.). The continuity of private education is at the Lycée Notre-Dame. Another high school, the Lycée Emile Peytavin allows, in addition to general education, technical and vocational education. Finally, now attached to the Lycée Notre-Dame, we find the Private Professional Lycée Plaisance.

Institutions of the city are also have one of the best success rates for the Baccalauréat diploma, compared with the other schools in the area, which puts them in the first half best institutions of France.

At the level of higher education, Mende welcomes a BTS in its different high schools. An , branch of the University of Perpignan, offers four courses: Multimedia, gerontology, City Council Secretary, and tourism.

Cultural events and festivities

The festivities of the town of Mende are held annually in the month of August. They are decorated with a flower parade and the election of "Miss Mende". Then, in September, every other year, Mende hosts its beer festival, with its twin town of Wunsiedel. The city has also several sports events. At the cultural level, the "meetings of writers" were organized at the beginning of the 1990s, in August. They have welcomed regional authors but also renowned authors such as Calixthe Beyala and Michel Folco.

Health

The department has a hospital, which opened in 1970. Five of the six services are located in Mende: Guy de Chauliac Hospital, the retirement home, the convalescence centre, the Training Institute in Nursing and boarding school. The sixth branch, another retirement home, is based at Rieutort-de-Randon.

The hospital has approximately 70 physicians and 750 health professionals.

To this one can add 20 physicians, general practitioners and specialists as well as a centre of firefighters. Though, if the implementation of the current hospital is fairly recent, the city has a fairly old hospital story.

In the 12th century was the "alms house" for the population. This hospital, located on Rue Angiran, derived its income from the operation of a mill in the district of La Vernède, as well as donations of the lords of the lands. It was partially destroyed in 1593 during the construction of a nearby citadel. Though the citadel disappeared in 1597, the hospital was not repaired immediately. From 1635 a budget was allocated for the rebuilding of the institution. It would not be built in the same place, and would take the name of "Hospital of Aygues-Passes". In 1677  became  and thus Count of Gévaudan. In his first year as bishop, he rebuilt a new hospital which became the "general hospital". In 1702 it enlarged, and at his death he bequeathed it all of his possessions. This hospital, today the Piencourt residence, remained in use until the inauguration of the hospital. Added to this hospital, two establishments existed following periods of epidemics, both which were outside the city. A plague centre, referred to as 'House of God', was established in the district of Janicot. At the Saint-Jean Bridge (now Pont-Roupt), a maladrerie was rebuilt in 1242, intended for the accommodation of lepers.

Sports
Mende is, by its number of licensees and all events, a sports town. It is one of only a few cities of France to have achieved this distinction twice.

Facilities

Mende features a sports zone known as the Complexe sportif de Jean Jacques Delmas [Sports complex of Jean Jacques Delmas], in honour of his death, having been originally of this project he was the mayor of Mende for 25 years. There are 3 football/rugby pitches (the Stade du Chapitre and 2 training grounds), the semi-Olympic  pool, tennis courts, a fitness room, a skate-park, a street-ball court, table-tennis hall and archery/shooting. It is in this complex which the '"Festival of sport" takes place every two years. Chapitre Stadium, enlarged at the Mediterranean Games has 500 seats, but this figure may be largely surpassed during some matches.

Installed on the causse d'Auge are three soccer/rugby fields and an athletics track, which came to replace the old track of Mirandol. The Stade de Mirandol had the municipal stadium office until the 1980s. Since 2006, an equestrian centre is also located on the causse, it comes in addition to the aging Sirvens centre located at the exit of the city. Finally, the causse d'Auge was the chosen site, in 2008, for the construction of a new gymnasium, opposite the football fields.

 offers a freestyle park, many hiking, mountain biking and running trails, a jogging track and a football field. On the Lot, since 1983, a canoe base has been developed in order to practice several water sports.

Near the Chaptal Lycée and the Henri Bourrillon College is the La Vernède complex. In this area are two gymnasiums, a dojo, a gymnastics Hall, one dance, one climbing (over an area outdoors), a covered petanque pitch and one outdoors. Before the construction of the gymnasium of La Vernède, this place was that of the municipal swimming pool and two tennis courts.

Close to other educational institutions, other gyms are installed. There are six in all in the city: La Vernède, Lycée Notre-Dame, Piencourt, Lycée Chaptal, Lycée Théophile Roussel and college Saint-Privat.

Sports clubs

Many clubs share the facilities of the city. One of the highlights of its history remains a finish in the last 32 of Coupe de France final played opposite Angoulême on 24 January 1999. More recently, Mende moved up to the last 16 of the finals at the 2013 Coupe de France, winning on this occasion the "ranking of the Petits Poucets".

At the top level, the MVL has a title of  obtained at the end of the 2008-2009 season and a participation in the third round of the 2010-2011 Coupe de France.

Of Rugby union (Rugby Club Mende Lozère), it found its place in Fédérale 3 in 2006, but returned to the regional level in the 2010s. The club however already evolved to a higher level a few years previously.

The handball team (Mende Gévaudan Club) is evolving in 2014-2015 in the National 3 France Championship. Finally, the basketball team (basketball Causses Mendois) was found in 2014-2015 at the regional level. For women there are also handball, volleyball and basketball clubs which are Mendois clubs of highest level.

Mende can be granted a special status to orienteering, an individual sport with team competitions. The fact remains that Mende is playing in the elite league of France, and M. G. C. Pétanque and its three veteran champions of France in 2007.

Sports diversity does not stop there. Mende clubs also include roller hockey (Les Comets). Mende is also home to individual sports: Athletics, badminton, cycling, motorcycling, as well as many combat sports clubs.

Since the beginning of the 2000s, a sports centre was set up to accompany young high school athletes to prepare for the best level.

Top athletes

Among professional sportspeople born in Mende, is the road cyclist Christophe Laurent who shone by winning the jersey for the best climber of the Tour de l'Avenir and the Tour of California.

The motorcyclist , winner of the prologue of the Paris-Dakar Rally (1991), also hails from Mende. He was one of the best enduro riders with the palmares of France, and was also vice World champion.

Kayaker Brigitte Guibal, Olympic silver medallist in 2000 in Sydney, was also born in Mende.

It is in 1988 that Marion Buisson was born in Mende. After making her athletics debut at the Éveil mendois, she continued her career at Clermont athletics.

Sporting events

This race is part of the most renowned of the enduro season and allows, in addition, mixing professional and amateur riders.

This race starts from Marvejols, joining Mende by the Col de Goudard and the Côte de Chabrits. It is sometimes used as a preparation marathon for major events (the World Championships, Olympic Games), but is also open to amateurs as the majority of the marathons. Since 2006, the month of July is also marked by the organisation of a national of pétanque.

Cycling is also in honour of the city. The  hosted the best professionals in the 1970s. Since 2006 and the rebirth of the Tour du Gévaudan, Mende is judged the final arrival of this amateur race of great importance. In 2008, the event was organised as the Finale de la Coupe des France des clubs [final of the Cup of France for clubs]. During the winter, a grand prix of regional cyclo-cross is also organized. The grand departure of the Tour de France VTT 1996, as well as the first two stages, happened at Mende.

Mende was also host city of the Mediterranean Games in 1993 by hosting cycling, football, and swimming events.

In October 2005, the city hosted the 37th national congress of the French hiking federation, Lozère being a popular department for hikers, and is crossed by two of the most important roads of the pilgrimage to Santiago de Compostela. Then, in 2007, Mende was the host of a round of the French enduro championships, as well as the final of the Coupe de France rally.

In 2008, France welcomed the enduro European grand prix, the final of the World Championship (WEC). It was the town of Alès which was chosen to host the competition. However the organization was forced to give up, and it was finally hosted by Mende on 11 and 12 October 2008. In 2011, the city hosted the Grand Prix of France, final of the World Championship.

Media
Mende is the seat of most of the media of Lozére. Thus we find the writings of the Lozère edition of Midi Libre and  [New Lozère], with regard to the written press.

The radio station France Bleu and  have their editorial offices in Lozère. While Radio Eaux-Vives Lozère is installed at the former Grand Seminary.

Worship

The town of Mende is the episcopal seat of Gévaudan and Lozère, religious life has always been linked with its bishops. Also chapter headquarters, Mende has welcomed a large number of canons. A religious brotherhood, the "Brotherhood of the White Penitents" has long existed and has a procession every Holy Thursday since the 17th century. The Tower of the Penitents (called so because it is adjacent to the chapel of the penitents) is one of the last vestiges of the ramparts of the city.

The large and small seminaries are traces of the presence of the formation of Catholic priests.

The main place of worship is the Cathedral of Notre-Dame and Saint-Privat, built at the request of Pope Urban V, in place of the old church built over the tomb of  but the city has many small chapels. One of the oldest is the chapel of Saint-Ilpide, on the hill of the executioner, which however was destroyed and replaced by a small chapel. Two other chapels are no longer used: That of the Penitents (future Museum of Religious Art) and the Chapel of Saint-Dominique (exhibition hall). The Chapel of the Hermitage (on ) and the cave which was drilled alongside, can still be used for offices.

The Carmelite convent has existed since 1880 and has hosted a community of Carmelite nuns, which ensures production of altar bread (or wafers) for the diocese (and those nearby). Another Convent is installed in Mende, which is the Adoration of Picpus Convent. At the Rue de la Chicanette is installed the Jeanne Delanoue community of the Providence; little used for celebration services, the place is used for meetings between people in the religious world. The community is at the origin of the creation of the institution Notre-Dame-de-la-Providence, a social children's home adjacent to its premises and which hosts minors under administrative and judicial protection. There are of other religious communities, mainly related to private schools and retirement or rest homes.

Worship in Mende, due to its history, is very oriented towards Catholicism, but there are other places of worship for other religions. Thus Mende, near of the Cévennes, has a Protestant temple installed in the Allée Paul Doumer.

The city also had a synagogue in the former Jewish quarter, but it has long since been abandoned. This synagogue, also called Ferrier House from the name of one of its former owners, is the last vestige of the Mende ghetto. The Jews were expelled from the Gévaudan in the 14th century, and this synagogue became the (Catholic) college of All Saints until the French Revolution.

Whilst counting the presence of a Muslim community, the city has no mosque, but simply an apartment that serves as place of worship.

Economy
Industrial (wood industry, jewelry), service centre (shops, restaurants, bars), administrative (generates a lot of jobs) and tourism (medieval town, excursions to Gorges du Tarn), Mende is the starting point for the establishment of new businesses in the department, and turned more towards new technologies, with the advent of the technological hub.

The city has more than 1300 companies, including about 900 in the commercial sector, and has an unemployment rate of 10.7% (2017).

Zones of activities

The city has five zones of economic activities (ZAE), each having a rather clearly defined role. The largest is the ZAE of the Causse d'Auge (north of the city), with a mainly industrial orientation in automation or in the management of the wood. The ZI of Gardès, on the road to Badaroux is an industrial area covering public works and mainly the building companies. The ZAE Lou Chaousse and Chabrits (both in the northwest) also have a vocation craft, but more oriented towards the trade for individuals. And finally, the Pôle lozérien d'économie numérique (POLeN) is turned to the new technologies.

In addition, since the mid-2000s, the  de Ramille was created. This area, wedged between the Lot and the RN 88 on the road to Balsièges hosts a commercial zone which has tended to develop. It is without doubt, with the area of the Causse d'Auge, the area of activity that has extended most recently.

In the near future a new area of activity should emerge north of Mende, in the commune of Badaroux. This area whose size is expected to reach approximately  initially, would be served by the  landscaped expressway.

The agricultural past

If the commune no longer has many farms, the city remains at the centre of a very rural area and is very oriented towards agriculture. Indeed, 54% of the Lozère territory is classified as a "utilised agricultural area". Livestock in the commune is mainly dedicated to the sheep sector, although cattle farms are found located between Mende and neighbouring communes.

This attraction to sheep is ancestral to Mende, since the city has long lived wool exploitation, since the 16th century. In 1333 the city already had a brotherhood of the weavers. In 1849, the town was still equipped with five large mills. However, while having a rich textile past, the city now retains no activity.

Industry
Like the Lozère department, industry in Mende is mainly oriented towards the timber sector: Its operation, its treatment, its derivatives, etc. Another industry that holds an important place in the city is that of construction and public works.

Shops and services

Mende is also the seat of the  that handles .

The city is strongly turned towards the tertiary sector. As said above, a majority of the enterprises of the city are shops. Mende is the centre of an area's population of approximately 25,000 inhabitants around the Lot Valley, the city therefore centralises much of the services. Its quality of prefecture adds to the presence of public service.

Tourism has also developed since the end of the 20th century. This openness on tourism translated between 1983 and 2008 by the creation of the office of tourism (municipal and intermunicipal), an increase of 400 beds offered to tourists, the opening of a holiday village and of a youth hostel, but also the creation of activity centre (canoe base, Freestyle Park, etc.). The city has eleven hotels, four with three stars and four having two. To this one can add the holiday village of Chapitre that offers 42 gîtes for rent, as well as two campsites near the Lot.

Other businesses are those that can be found in other modern cities (banks, insurance, bakeries, the press houses, clothes, etc.). The city has a supermarket and a hypermarket, as well as several superettes and other discounters. The hypermarket, which is of recent construction, belongs to the Système U group and is located in the new area of activity of Ramilles. The supermarket (Intermarché) is, meanwhile, close to the city centre. Markets, vestiges of the traditional markets of the city are many, taking place on Wednesday (textile, utility, etc.) at Place Chaptal, and on Saturday mornings (food market) at Place Chaptal and Place Urbain V. In addition, night markets are held during the summer.

Business
The main companies in terms of turnover, as well as major private employers are:

Local culture and heritage

Places and monuments

Since 1981 Mende has been classified as a city of art, and, since 2000, the grouping of Mende and Lot in the Gévaudan has the label of "city and land of art and history".

Indeed, the city has a rich architectural heritage, witness of the prosperous time related to the papacy.

The Cathedral Notre-Dame and Saint-Privat

The Cathedral of Saint-Privat (classed as a historical monument in 1906) whose construction began in 1368 at the initiative of Pope Urban V. Its bell towers date back, however, to the 16th century, following the destruction of one of them during the passage of the Huguenots by Matthieu Merle. The large belfry included housing "Non Pareille", the largest bell in the world melted between 1517 and 1521 in Villefort and destroyed during the Wars of Religion. There remains only the clapper. The cathedral consists of twelve rectangular chapels, two pentagonal chapels and a sacristy. Originally it was built above the Sainte-Thècle crypt where the body of Saint Privat had been buried. It is located next to the old episcopal palace.

Public fountains

The city has many public fountains. Water from the causses thus enters a piping system located beneath the city before joining the Lot. Two of them (Aigues-Passe and Soubeyrand) are classified as historic monuments. Piped water also enters the old wash house of the Calquières, still visible on Rue d'Angiran.

The Tower of the Penitents

This tower is one of the few remains of the ancient walls of the 12th century. Protecting the Gate of Angiran which was next to it, this tower served as guard for the short-lived Seneschal of Mende. It includes three floors and an attic. This is the installation of the chapel which is adjacent, and especially its bell tower at the top which saved the tower during the destruction of the walls in 1768.

The Notre-Dame Bridge

Dating back to the 13th century, this bridge is one of the symbols of the city. It has never been carried away by frequent floods in Mende. It formerly went by the name of Peyrenc Bridge, then took the name of Notre Dame due to the presence on its mouth of a Virgin, which disappeared during the Wars of Religion.

The Hermitage of Saint Privat

Since his Hermitage was built, it also to allow the pilgrims to go there. It can be accessed either by Way of the Cross (from the market) or by road from the causse (RD 25). At the hermitage, we find a hotel for the reception of the pilgrims, a chapel, grotto and a breakthrough designed to the original cave.

The former consular home

The House where the consul sat, since 1578, also served as city hall after the Revolution. On its pediment is found the arms of the city: "Azure in the Gothic M of or, a shining Sun similarly topped." Facing it is a trompe-l'œil wall symbolizing the twinning of Mende and Volterra.

Bahours Castle

Located in the northwest of the city, the Bahours locality had two castles, one of which was destroyed in 1960. The remaining one is a strong house (manse) built in the 17th century, possibly on the foundations of a more ancient building. The main interest of this strong house is its kitchen listed as a historical monument, like the whole building.

Cultural facilities

Mende features a municipal theatre and several rooms that can be used to this kind of show. The ancient theatre of the city turned into cinema. A development project involves the construction of a new multicultural hall. In addition, Mende has a departmental library, the Lamartine Library.

Theatres and auditoriums
The ancient theatre of the city, established between 1890 and 1895, was replaced by a cinema. The main room used for the theatre is now the festival hall located at the market. This room, and its natural scenery of arches, is multi-cultural and is the largest in the city in terms of capacity. On the market lies the antirouille, a municipal building for young people and allowing everyone to have access to the internet, this building has a room to organize concerts.

Near the market, along the Chemin Saint-Ilpide, the Urban V municipal room hosts plays, live shows, and also meetings and projections (world knowledge, for example).

Finally as part of the redevelopment of the market (started by the installation of the intercommunal tourism office and the renovation of the Lamartine Library), an auditorium should be created behind the festival hall (the Emile-Joly Square being moved).

Museums and exhibitions

It was however closed due to lack of budget. Before it, a museum was located in a house next to the prison.

The Chapel of Saint-Dominique and the current Department Hall can serve as an exhibition space, as can the Chapel of the Penitents and the former consular house.

Quotes on Mende

The poem, written by an author whose story did not retain the name, was confirmed in the 19th century:

However, not everyone had a positive vision of the city. It had long had problems with sewage into the modern era, and was denigrated despite its charm:

This quote comes perhaps from the conditions in which the geographer of the king came in the city. Like those who would declare to Serge Livrozet that Mende was capital of Lozère and torture.

Personalities linked to the commune

Those born in Mende, or having a very strong tie with the city include:

Born in Mende
 (1709-1792), deputy of the clergy of the Seneschal of Bazas and Dean of the members of the Estates General of 1792.
 (1740-1817), art dealer and collector, founder of the society of fine arts in Montpellier
 (1757-1844), .
 (1786-1849), Member of Parliament for Lozère, .
 (1813-1879), great executioner of Paris.
 (1845-1925), French lieutenant, .
Marie Borrel, born around 1886, recognized as part of the Lourdes Medical Bureau.
 (1891-1944), lawyer. During World War II, he was mayor of the city before becoming a hero of the Resistance, deported to Auschwitz, then Buchenwald, died on German roads.
Gaby Bruyère (1924-1978), actress.
Thierry Jean-Pierre (1955-2005), investigative judge, a lawyer and politician.
Claude Érignac (1937-1998), French officer, prefect of Corsica.
, officer French general, best known as the founder and head of the Chantiers de la Jeunesse during the Vichy regime.
 (1941-1981), politician, Deputy of Mayenne.
Michel Rostain, born in 1942, theatre director and writer, Prix Goncourt du premier roman in 2011
Francis Saint-Léger born in 1957, politician, Member of Parliament for Lozère.
Élisabeth Filhol, born in 1965, writer.
Brigitte Guibal, born in 1971, kayaker.
Quentin Elias (1974-2014), singer and former member of the boy band Alliage, model and actor in adult films.
Christophe Laurent, born in 1977, professional cyclist.
Marion Buisson, born in 1988, pole vaulter.
, born in 1991, handball player
, born in 1992, footballer

Linked to the commune
Urban V (1310-1370), Pope, born in the commune of Le Pont-de-Montvert but strongly attached to the episcopal capital of Gévaudan.
Jean-Antoine Chaptal (1756-1832), born in the vicinity of Mende, but in the commune of Badaroux, it is however very linked to the city. He was a chemist, businessman and Councillor of State under Napoleon. He was the inventor of chaptalisation (process aimed at improving the quality of the wine).
 (1796-1864), Bishop of Saint-Dié was educated at Mende, from the time his father  was the first prefect of the Lozère.
. Engineer and French diplomat. Prefect of Lozère from 1869 to 1870.
Paul Doumer (1857-1932), before becoming President of the Republic, he was a college professor in Mende.
Clovis Brunel (1884-1971) born in Amiens, but who long worked as an archivist in Mende.
Joseph Joanovici (1905-1965), under house arrest in Mende.
Alexandre Grothendieck (1928-2014), mathematician, winner of the Fields Medal. As a child, he was deported to the camp of Rieucros.
 (1808-1876), physician and botanist, studied at the seminary and became a Bachelor of Arts, there, in 1827.

Heraldry, motto and logo

Coat of arms of 1475
When King Louis XI granted autonomy to the city, he granted new arms in 1469. An 'L' surmounted by a crown, in gratitude to the king, was added to these in 1475.

Current blazon
The current coat of arms dates from the sixteenth century. These weapons were registered in the Armorial General of France in 1697.

See also
 Communes of the Lozère department
 
 
 Parlement of Toulouse
 Languedoc
 Estates of Languedoc
 Pays d'états

Explanatory notes

Citations

General bibliography

External links

 Mende (in French, photographs)
 City council website
 Office de Tourisme Mende 
 

Communes of Lozère
Gévaudan
Prefectures in France